Célestin Bergevin (September 7, 1832 – July 17, 1910) was a farmer and political figure in Quebec. He represented Beauharnois in the Legislative Assembly of Quebec from 1867 to 1871 and from 1878 to 1886 as a Conservative member.

He was born in Saint-Timothée, Lower Canada, the son of Pierre Bergevin and Angélique Mercier. Bergevin was mayor of Saint-Clément-de-Beauharnois from 1878 to 1882. He was also a justice of the peace and harbour master for Valleyfield. In 1857, he married Marie Salomae May. Bergevin was defeated by George-Étienne Cartier when he ran for reelection in 1871, also losing by-elections in 1873 and 1875. He was successful in 1878 and 1881 but defeated again in 1886. Bergevin died in Salaberry-de-Valleyfield at the age of 77.

His cousins Achille Bergevin and Arthur Plante, and his uncle Moïse Plante were also elected to represent Beauharnois in the Quebec assembly.

References 
 

1832 births
1910 deaths
Conservative Party of Quebec MNAs
Mayors of places in Quebec
People from Salaberry-de-Valleyfield
Canadian justices of the peace